Alayna Treene (born September 8, 1994) is an American journalist. She is currently a Congressional reporter for Axios, after previously covering the Trump White House.

In December 2021, Treene was named to Forbes' "30 under 30" list for media.

Early life and education 
Treene was born in the Skillman section of Montgomery Township, New Jersey. She graduated summa cum laude from George Washington University in 2016 with a BA in journalism and mass communications.

Career 
Treene started her career as an editorial intern at CBS News, Variety and for Bloomberg News in London. She joined Axios as a staff reporter in 2016 before she became an associate news editor in 2018. Treene was appointed a White House and national political reporter covering the Trump administration and the impeachment inquiry in 2018. Treene now covers Congress, the Biden administration, and elections. She has appeared as a political analyst on C-SPAN, Fox News, CBS News and MSNBC.

References

External links 
 Alayna Treene on Twitter

1994 births
Living people
American women journalists
American political journalists
American reporters and correspondents
George Washington University alumni
CBS News people
Variety (magazine) people
Bloomberg L.P. people
MSNBC people
People from Montgomery Township, New Jersey
Journalists from New Jersey